The Lipscomb Bisons are the athletic teams that represent Lipscomb University, located in Nashville, Tennessee, in intercollegiate sports as a member of the Division I level of National Collegiate Athletic Association (NCAA), primarily competing in the ASUN Conference (formerly known as the Atlantic Sun Conference until after the 2015–16 school year) since the 2003–04 academic year. The Bisons previously competed in the TranSouth Athletic Conference (TranSouth or TSAC) of the National Association of Intercollegiate Athletics (NAIA) from 1996–97 to 2000–01. Their mascot is LU the Bison.

Varsity teams 
Lipscomb competes in 17 intercollegiate varsity sports: Men's sports include baseball, basketball, cross country, golf, soccer, tennis and track & field (indoor and outdoor); basketball, cross country, golf, soccer, softball, tennis, track & field (indoor and outdoor) and volleyball.

A member of the ASUN Conference (ASUN), Lipscomb sponsors teams in eight men's and nine women's NCAA sanctioned sports.

National championships

Team

References

External links